Leonie Adam (born  in Filderstadt) is a German individual trampoline gymnast, representing her nation at international competitions.

She made her international senior debut for the German national team in 2012 at the World Cup in Loule, Portugal. She competed at world championships, including at the 2013, 2014 and 2015 Trampoline World Championships. She participated at the 2015 European Games in Baku finishing 10th in the individual event. She suffered from stomach pain in February 2016. 
She competed at the 2016 Summer Olympics in Rio de Janeiro where she finished 10th in the qualifications and did not advance to the final.

Personal
Born in Filderstadt, she currently lives in Stuttgart. She studied Economics at the Nürtingen-Geislingen University of Applied Science in Germany.

References

External links

 
http://www.zimbio.com/pictures/JR_9vE9JZ3Z/Gymnastics+Trampoline+Olympics+Day+7/q3E2fMSq03c/Leonie+Adam
http://www.gettyimages.com/pictures/leonie-adam-14702934#leonie-adam-of-germany-competes-during-the-trampoline-gymnastics-on-picture-id588691680
https://www.youtube.com/watch?v=D02IlBvW4bQ

1993 births
Living people
German female trampolinists
People from Filderstadt
Sportspeople from Stuttgart (region)
Gymnasts at the 2015 European Games
European Games competitors for Germany
Gymnasts at the 2010 Summer Youth Olympics
Gymnasts at the 2016 Summer Olympics
Olympic gymnasts of Germany
21st-century German women